For each event, a first place gives 30 points, a 2nd place 26 pts, a 3rd place 24 pts, a 4th place 22 pts, then linearly decreasing by one point down to the 25th place. Equal placings (ties) give an equal number of points. The sum of all WC points of the season gives the biathlete's total WC score.

1990–91 Top 3 Standings

Standings

References

Biathlon World Cup
World Cup
World Cup